The 16th Parachute Brigade was an airborne forces brigade of the British Army.

It can trace its formation to February 1948, when the 2nd Independent Parachute Brigade left the 6th Airborne Division and moved to Germany, becoming part of the British Army of the Rhine. The 6th Airborne Division was disbanded soon afterwards, leaving the 2nd Independent Parachute Brigade as the only brigade-sized airborne formation in the British Army. In June the 5th (Scottish) Parachute Battalion was renumbered the 2nd Battalion, The Parachute Regiment, the 4th/6th Parachute Battalion became the 1st Battalion, and the 7th (Light Infantry) Parachute Battalion became the 3rd Battalion. Finally, on 25 June 1948, the brigade was re-designated as the 16th Independent Parachute Brigade Group, taking the "1" and "6" from the two wartime airborne divisions, the 1st and 6th. 

In July 1960, the brigade was re-designated as the 16th  Parachute Brigade Group removing the word "Independent" from the title. In January 1965, the brigade was re-designated as the 16th Parachute Brigade removing the word "Group" from the title. The Army Restructuring Plan 1975 assigned the United Kingdom Mobile Force (UKMF) role to the brigade to replace 3rd Division which meant the loss of airborne status. On 1 April 1977, 16th Parachute Brigade reorganised and was re-designated as the 6th Field Force . On 1 April 1978, the 6th Field Force assumed the full role of the UKMF.

Notes

References

Airborne infantry brigades of the United Kingdom
Military units and formations established in 1948